Misha Green (born September 22, 1984, in Sacramento, California) is an American screenwriter, director, and producer. She is best known as the showrunner of the supernatural series Lovecraft Country on HBO and creator and executive producer of the historical drama Underground.

Career 
Green has previously been a staff writer for Heroes and Sons of Anarchy and a producer for Helix.

In 2016, together with fellow Heroes alumnus Joe Pokaski, Green created Underground, a period drama about the Underground Railroad, which takes place primarily in the Antebellum South and bordering free states of the North. The first season premiered on WGN America on March 9, 2016, and the show received a positive critical response. On April 25, 2016, the network renewed Underground for a second season, which premiered on March 8, 2017.

In 2020, Green wrote a supernatural horror show, Lovecraft Country, which was produced by Get Out director and writer Jordan Peele. Based on Matt Ruff's novel of the same name, the series tackles race issues, set in the 1950s, while also utilizing elements of H. P. Lovecraft. The show received a "straight-to-series" order from HBO. The series co-stars Underground star Jurnee Smollett-Bell. On July 2, 2021, HBO announced that the series would not be returning for a second season.

In January 2021, she was chosen by MGM to write and direct the sequel to 2018's Tomb Raider, a franchise she has described herself as a fan of since its first entries on PlayStation. Green confirmed via her official Twitter account in May 2021 that the first draft of the script, with the working title Tomb Raider: Obsidian, had been completed. In July 2021 Alicia Vikander told Collider that the sequel is still happening but had not been greenlit yet. In September 2021 Green responded to a fan question about the status of the film, and indicated that she was still set to direct her own script. In July 2022, it was reported that MGM had lost the film rights to the Tomb Raider franchise, after the window ran out to give the sequel the green light, culminating in Vikander's departure from the lead role. The rights reverted to the game company and prompted a bidding war among studios.

In July 2021 Green signed a multi-year overall deal to create and develop television projects for Apple TV+.

In April 2021 Green was announced as producer for the upcoming film, Cleopatra Jones. She will also write and produce the upcoming Netflix film The Mother, and write the upcoming Black Canary film for Warner Bros.

In January 2023, she was announced to make her directorial debut with Sunflower, a Lionsgate film. The script was the first she sold after arriving in Hollywood.

Controversy
Lovecraft Country was allegedly cancelled due to Green's creation of a toxic work environment, according to several writers.

Filmography 
Film

Television

Awards and nominations

References

External links

American television writers
American women screenwriters
African-American screenwriters
American television directors
Showrunners
Living people
American women television producers
American women television writers
21st-century American screenwriters
21st-century American women writers
American women television directors
American television producers
1984 births
21st-century African-American women writers
21st-century African-American writers
20th-century African-American people
20th-century African-American women